Brampton Gurdon may refer to:
 Brampton Gurdon (of Assington and Letton) (died 1649), Member of Parliament for Sudbury (1621) and High Sheriff of Suffolk
 Brampton Gurdon (of Letton) (1606–1669), his son, Member of Parliament for Sudbury (1645–1653) and a cavalry colonel in the English Civil War
 Brampton Gurdon (lecturer) (died 1741), Archdeacon of Sudbury, fellow of Caius College, Cambridge and Boyle lecturer
 Brampton Gurdon (Norfolk MP) (1797–1881), British politician
 William Brampton Gurdon (1840–1910), Norfolk MP sometimes called Sir Brampton Gurdon